Judith Brown may refer to:

Judi Brown (born 1961), American athlete
Judie Brown (born 1944), American anti-abortion campaigner
Judith Brown (sculptor) (1931–1992), American dancer, painter and sculptor
Judith C. Brown (born 20th century), American writer and historian
Judith M. Brown (born 1944), British historian of modern South Asia
Judy Brown (born 20th century), American physicist and engineer
Judy Brown (professor) (born 1956), New Zealand academic
Judith K. Brown, American phytopathologist